There have been four baronetcies created for persons with the surname Butler; two in the Baronetage of Ireland and two in the Baronetage of the United Kingdom. As of 2014 two of the creations are extant.

The Butler Baronetcy, of Cloughgrenan in the County of Carlow, was created in the Baronetage of Ireland on 16 August 1628 for Thomas Butler. He notably represented County Carlow in the Irish House of Commons and served as Sheriff of County Carlow. Butler was the illegitimate son of the Hon. Sir Edmund Butler of Cloughgrenan, second son of James Butler, 9th Earl of Ormonde (see the Earl of Ormond). His grandson, the third Baronet, also sat as Member of the Irish Parliament and served as Sheriff of the county. His eldest son, the fourth Baronet, represented County Carlow in the Irish Parliament and was admitted to the Irish Privy Council. He was succeeded by his nephew, the fifth Baronet. He represented County Carlow in the Irish House of Commons for many years. His son, the sixth Baronet, sat as Member of the Irish Parliament for County Carlow and Portarlington. He was succeeded by his eldest son, the seventh Baronet. He represented County Carlow in the Irish Parliament and also briefly (see County Carlow (UK Parliament constituency)) in the British House of Commons from 1801 to 1802. His great-grandson, the tenth Baronet, was High Sheriff and Vice Lord-Lieutenant for County Carlow. His son, the eleventh Baronet, served as High Sheriff of County Carlow in 1905 and was also a Deputy Lieutenant of the county. His son, the twelfth Baronet, was a Colonel in the Grenadier Guards. As of 2014 the title is held by the latter's son, the thirteenth Baronet, who succeeded in 1994.

The family seat was Ballin Temple, near Tullow, County Cork.

The Butler Baronetcy, of Polestown in the County of Kilkenny, was created in the Baronetage of Ireland on 8 July 1645 for Walter Butler. He was a descendant of Edmund Butler, younger son of James Butler, 3rd Earl of Ormonde. The title became either dormant or extinct on the death of the fourth Baronet in 1762.

The Butler Baronetcy, of Old Park in Devizes in the County of Wiltshire, was created in the Baronetage of the United Kingdom on 28 January 1922 for the businessman Reginald Butler. As of 2014 the title is held by his great-grandson, Sir Richard Butler, the fourth Baronet, who succeeded his father in 2012. He is a member of the executive committee of the Standing Council of the Baronetage.

The Butler Baronetcy, of Edgbaston in the County of Warwick, was created in the Baronetage of the United Kingdom on 29 January 1926 for the brewer William Butler, Chairman of Mitchells & Butlers Ltd. His only son William Owen Butler (1898–1935) predeceased him, without male issue. Consequently, the baronetcy became extinct on Butler's death in 1939.

Butler baronets, of Cloughgrenan (1628)
Sir Thomas Butler, 1st Baronet (died )
Sir Edmund Butler, 2nd Baronet (died c. 1650)
Sir Thomas Butler, 3rd Baronet (died 1703)
Sir Pierce Butler, 4th Baronet (1670–1732)
Sir Richard Butler, 5th Baronet (1699–1771)
Sir Thomas Butler, 6th Baronet (1735–1772)
Sir Richard Butler, 7th Baronet (1761–1817)
Sir Thomas Butler, 8th Baronet (1783–1861)
Sir Richard Pierce Butler, 9th Baronet (1813–1862)
Sir Thomas Pierce Butler, 10th Baronet (1836–1909)
Sir Richard Pierce Butler, 11th Baronet (1872–1955)
Colonel Sir Thomas Pierce Butler, 12th Baronet, CVO DSO OBE JP (1910–1994)
Sir Richard Pierce Butler, 13th Baronet (born 1940)

The heir apparent is the present holder's son Thomas Pierce Butler (born 1966).

Butler baronets, of Polestown (1645)
Sir Walter Butler, 1st Baronet (died 1650)
Sir Richard Butler, 2nd Baronet (died c. 1679)
Sir Walter Butler, 3rd Baronet (c. 1678–1723)
Sir Edmund Butler, 4th Baronet (c. 1708–1762)

Butler baronets, of Old Park (1922)
Sir (Robert) Reginald Frederick Butler, 1st Baronet (1866–1933)
Sir (Reginald) Thomas Butler, 2nd Baronet (1901–1959)
Sir (Reginald) Michael Thomas Butler, 3rd Baronet (1928–2012)
Sir (Reginald) Richard Michael Butler, 4th Baronet (born 1953)
 
The heir apparent is the present holder's Reginald Paul Butler (born 1988).

Butler baronets, of Edgbaston (1926)
Sir William Waters Butler, 1st Baronet (1866–1939)
Sir William Waters Butler was a benefactor to the University of Birmingham. Sir William gave £10,000 to Birmingham University in 1936 to provide scholarships, to be known as the Joseph Chamberlain Memorial scholarships.

See also
Butler dynasty

Notes

References
Kidd, Charles & Williamson, David (eds.). Debrett's Peerage and Baronetage (1990 edition). New York: St Martin's Press, 1990, 
Official Roll of the Baronetage

People associated with the University of Birmingham
Baronetcies in the Baronetage of Ireland
Baronetcies in the Baronetage of the United Kingdom
Extinct baronetcies in the Baronetage of Ireland
Extinct baronetcies in the Baronetage of the United Kingdom
Butler dynasty
1628 establishments in Ireland
1922 establishments in the United Kingdom